Skyway is the second album by New York City based group Skyy released in 1980 on Salsoul Records.

Track listing

Personnel
Randy Muller - Flute, Keyboards, Percussion
Solomon Roberts, Jr. - Drums, Guitar, Vocals
Gerald Lebon - Bass
Tommy McConnell - Drums
Anibal "Butch" Sierra - Guitar
Larry Greenberg - Keyboards
Bonny Dunning, Delores Dunning Milligan, Denise Dunning Crawford - Vocals

Additional Personnel
Sandy Billups - Backing Vocals

Charts

Weekly charts

Year-end charts

Singles

References

External links
 Skyy-Skyway at Discogs

1980 albums
Skyy (band) albums
Salsoul Records albums